Greenhead is a village in Northumberland, England. The A69 bypasses the village, but until the 1980s all vehicular traffic passed through it. The village lies just outside the Northumberland National Park, close to Hadrian's Wall. Just to the north of the village is the 12th-century Thirlwall Castle, recently restored and opened to the public. Nearby villages include Upper Denton and Haltwhistle.

A former Methodist chapel in the village is now a youth hostel.

The Pennine Way, the UK's first National Trail, passes through Greenhead.

Governance 
Greenhead is in the parliamentary constituency of Hexham. The local authority is Northumberland County Council, a unitary authority.

Landmarks 
It was built in the 12th century, and later strengthened using stones from nearby Hadrian's Wall, but began to fall into disrepair in the 17th century. The site is protected by Grade I listed building and Scheduled Ancient Monument status.

Transport 
The village was served by Greenhead railway station on the Newcastle and Carlisle Railway, also known as the Tyne Valley Line. The line was opened in 1838, and links the city of Newcastle upon Tyne in Tyne and Wear with Carlisle in Cumbria. The line follows the course of the River Tyne through Northumberland. The station opened on 19 July 1836, when the section from Carlisle London Road to Greenhead opened, and closed in 1967. The nearest open station is at Haltwhistle (3 miles).

See also 
Hostel
Border Counties Railway

References

External links

Northumberland Communities (accessed: 10 November 2008)

Villages in Northumberland
Civil parishes in Northumberland